Time for Kids (or TFK) is a division magazine of Time magazine that is produced especially for children. The magazine was established in 1995. It contains some national news, a "Cartoon of the Week", and other features in its weekly eight pages. The headquarters was in Tampa, Florida. Later it began to be published in New York City. It is distributed in various schools across the United States.

The magazine also runs special edition issues, and a website which offers daily news coverage and is the home of the TFK "Kid Reporter" program.

There is a TFK edition of the trivia game Don't Quote Me, which has won several awards.

See also

Time for Kids Almanac

References

External links
 TimeForKids.com – official website
 TIME Media Kit

Children's magazines published in the United States
Education magazines
Former Time Warner subsidiaries
Magazines established in 1997
Magazines published in Florida
Magazines published in New York City
Time (magazine)